Moritz Hermann or Boris Semyonovich (von) Jacobi (21 September 1801, Potsdam – 10 March 1874, Saint Petersburg) was a Prussian and Russian Imperial engineer and physicist of Jewish descent. Jacobi worked mainly in the Russian Empire. He furthered progress in galvanoplastics, electric motors, and wire telegraphy.

Motors
Born into an Ashkenazi Jewish family, Jacobi began to study magnetic motors in 1834. In 1835 moved to Dorpat (now Tartu, Estonia) to lecture at Dorpat University. He moved to Saint Petersburg in 1837 to research the usage of electromagnetic forces for moving machines at the Russian Academy of Sciences. He investigated the power of an electromagnet in  motors and generators. While studying the transfer of power from a battery to an electric motor, he deduced the maximum power theorem. Jacobi tested the output of motors by determining the amount of zinc consumed by the battery. With the financial assistance of Czar Nicholas, in 1839 Jacobi constructed a 28-foot electric motor boat powered by battery cells, which carried 14 passengers on the Neva river against the current at three miles per hour.

Jacobi's law

 Circuit Diagram 
 Power is being transferred from the source,
 with voltage V and resistance RS,
 to a load with resistance RL, 
 resulting in a current I. I is simply  
 the source voltage divided by the total
 circuit resistance 

The law known as the maximum power theorem states:

 "Maximum power is transferred when the internal resistance of the source equals the resistance of the load, when the external resistance can be varied, and the internal resistance is constant."

The transfer of maximum power from a source with a fixed internal resistance to a load, the resistance of the load must be the same as that of the source. This law is of use when driving a load such as an electric motor from a battery.

Electrotyping and telegraphy

In 1838, he discovered galvanoplastics, or electrotyping, a method of making printing plates by electroplating. The way this works is analogous to a battery acting in reverse. The stereotype was an impression taken from a form of movable lead type and used for printing instead of the original type. This technique is used in relief printing.

He also worked on the development of the electric telegraph. In 1842-1845 he built a telegraph line between Saint Petersburg and Tsarskoe Selo using an underground cable. In 1867 he was a Russian delegate to the Commission on Measurement Units at the Paris World's Fair. He was a strong proponent of the metric system.

Naval mine
In 1853, Jacobi developed the Jacobi naval mine. Its production was approved by the Committee for Mines of the Ministry of War of the Russian Empire and in 1854 60 Jacobi mines were laid in the vicinity of the Forts Pavel and Alexander (Kronstadt).

Family
Von Jacobi's brother was the mathematician Carl Gustav Jacob Jacobi.

Notes

External links

 Calvert, J. B., "Jacobi's Theorem Also known as the Maximum Power Transfer Theorem, misunderstanding of it retarded development of dynamos". March 30, 2001
  Jacobi's motor - The first real electric motor of 1834

1801 births
1874 deaths
German Ashkenazi Jews
German emigrants to the Russian Empire
Engineers from the Russian Empire
Russian electrical engineers
Inventors from the Russian Empire
Demidov Prize laureates
Full members of the Saint Petersburg Academy of Sciences
Burials at Smolensky Lutheran Cemetery
19th-century engineers from the Russian Empire
Sustainable transport pioneers